Mahatsara Iefaka is a rural municipality in Madagascar. It belongs to the district of Mananjary, which is a part of Vatovavy. The population of the commune was estimated to be approximately 5,000 in 2001 commune census.

Only primary schooling is available. The majority 99% of the population of the commune are farmers.  The most important crop is rice, while other important products are coffee and cassava. Services provide employment for 1% of the population.

References

Populated places in Vatovavy